Okeelala Creek is a stream in the U.S. state of Mississippi.

Okeelala is a name derived from the Choctaw language purported to mean "splashing water". A variant transliteration is "Okolalah Creek".

References

Rivers of Mississippi
Rivers of Lee County, Mississippi
Rivers of Prentiss County, Mississippi
Mississippi placenames of Native American origin